The North Korean men's national under 20 ice hockey team is the national under-20 ice hockey team in North Korea. The team represents North Korea at the International Ice Hockey Federation's World Junior Hockey Championship Division III.

Tournament participation

World Championships
1988 - 23rd place (7th in Pool C)
1989 - 19th place (3rd in Pool C)
1990 - 18th place (2nd in Pool C)
1991 - 17th place (1st in Pool C) Promoted to Pool B
1992 - 16th place (8th in Pool B) Relegated to Pool C
1993 - 22nd place (6th in Pool C)
1994-08 - did not participate
2009 - cancelled
2010 - 37th place (3rd in Division III)
2011 - 37th place (3rd in Division III)
2012 - did not participate

Junior
Korea, North